Boronia elisabethiae is a plant in the citrus family Rutaceae and is endemic to Tasmania. It is a semi-erect or weakly spreading, woody shrub with pinnate leaves and white to pink, four-petalled flowers.

Description
The flowers are white to pink and are arranged singly or in groups of up to three in upper leaf axils or on the ends of the branches.

Taxonomy and naming
Boronia elisabethiae was first formally described in 2003 by Marco F. Duretto who published the description in  Muelleria from a specimen collected near Lake Pedder. The specific epithet (elisabethiae) honours Elisabeth Murdoch, a patron of the Royal Botanic Gardens Victoria.

Distribution and habitat
This boronia grows in heath and button grass moorland in western Tasmania.

References 

elisabethiae
Flora of Tasmania
Plants described in 2003
Taxa named by Marco Duretto